

Qualification timeline

1. Colombia was scheduled to host the third qualification tournament but had to withdraw when the money budgeted for the event had to be reassigned to flood relief. On May 15, Panama was confirmed to host the tournament. Earlier Dominican Republic and the Bahamas had put in bids.

Qualification summary

Light flyweight (-49kg)

Flyweight (-52kg)

1. Ortiz failed a drug test and will not compete at the games.

Bantamweight (-56kg)

Lightweight (-60kg)

Light welterweight (-64kg)

Welterweight (-69kg)

Middleweight (-75kg)

Light heavyweight (-81kg)

Heavyweight (-91kg)

Super heavyweight (+91kg)

Women's flyweight (51kg)

1. Jemyma Betrian of the Netherlands Antilles was disqualified because she had worked as a professional Muay Thai fighter.

Women's light welterweight (60kg)

Women's light heavyweight (75kg)

References

External links
List of qualified athletes

P
Qualification for the 2011 Pan American Games